Silk and Steel may refer to:
 Silk + Steel, a 1986 album by Giuffria
 Silk & Steel (Five Star album)
 A type of guitar string made by several manufacturers for acoustic steel string guitars. They are overwound steel strings with silk filaments running under the winding.